Quanta Services is an American corporation that provides infrastructure services for electric power, pipeline, industrial and communications industries. Capabilities include the planning, design, installation, program management, maintenance and repair of most types of network infrastructure. In June 2009, Quanta Services was added to the S&P 500 index, replacing Ingersoll-Rand.

Quanta Services employs about 40,000 people. Its operating companies achieved combined revenues of about $11 billion in 2018. It is headquartered in Houston, Texas. In 1998, Quanta went public on the New York Stock Exchange under the ticker symbol, PWR.

Current leadership
On March 14, 2016, Earl C. “Duke” Austin succeeded former chief executive officer, Jim O’Neil. Austin is currently president, chief executive officer and chief operating officer. He is a graduate of Sam Houston State University in Huntsville, Texas, and is the former president of Quanta's Operating Unit, North Houston Pole Line.

On April 2, 2012, Derrick A. Jensen succeed former chief financial officer, James H. Haddox. Jensen is a graduate of Oklahoma State University.

Colson and PAR
The man behind the creation of Quanta Services is former executive chairman, John R. Colson. After earning a degree in geology from the University of Missouri at Kansas City, Colson entered the military and served one year in Vietnam. He was discharged from the Army in 1971 and returned to Kansas City, taking temporary employment at PAR Electrical Contractors, Inc., which built high-voltage transmission lines, distribution lines, and substations, and provided other electric utility infrastructure services.

Colson's initial job was to carry stakes for a survey team. Within three years, he was named manager of engineering services, and after six, he had worked his way up to vice-president of operations. After becoming executive vice-president and general manager in the early 1980s, he began buying the company, became president in 1991, and ultimately emerged as its owner.

Initial formation
In the 1990s, the electrical contracting business was highly fragmented, populated by more than 50,000 companies, the vast majority of which were small, owner-operated enterprises. Deregulation in the electric utility industries in a number of states prompted utilities to become more cost-competitive, leading to the outsourcing of infrastructure work to contractors who could do the job more efficiently. Moreover, much of the transmission and distribution infrastructure in the United States was aging and in need of repair or replacement. In 1997, Colson spearheaded the combination of four contractors to form Quanta Services, Inc., which then established its headquarters in Houston with Colson as its head. In addition to PAR, Quanta consisted of Union Power Construction Co., Trans Tech Electric Inc., and Potelco, Inc.

Initial public offering
With BT Alex Brown Incorporated, BancAmerica Robertson Stephens, and Sanders Morris Mundy Inc. serving as underwriters, Quanta completed its IPO in February 1998, raising $45 million. Of that amount, $21 million was used to pay the cash portion of the buyouts of the four founding companies. Much of the balance, along with a $175 million line of credit arranged with a consortium of nine banks, was used on over a dozen acquisitions completed in 1998. Acquired telecom companies included Manuel Brothers; Smith Contracting; Telecom Network Specialists; North Pacific Construction Company; NorAm Telecommunications; Spalj Construction Company; and Golden State Utility Company. Acquired electric contractors included Harker & Harker; Sumter Builders; and Environmental Professional Associates. Hybrid acquisitions included Wilson Roadbores and Underground Construction Company.

A secondary offering was completed in late January 1999. The company had planned to sell 3.5 million shares at $21 per share, but interest was so strong that in the end 4.6 million shares were sold at $23.25 per share. All told, Quanta realized $101.1 million, money used to fund the acquisition of 40 additional companies, which in total cost $323.6 million in cash and notes and 15 million shares of stock. Many of these additions were made to expand Quanta's business in gas transmission and cable television.

UtiliCorp takeover bid
In 2001, UtiliCorp United Inc. (now Aquila, Inc.), an energy company with whom PAR had been doing business since the 1950s attempted a takeover of Quanta. UtiliCorp owned about 36 percent of Quanta, an investment that was originally part of a strategic alliance when UtiliCorp outsourced all of its maintenance needs to Quanta. Quanta resisted, and in October 2001 the two parties signed a standstill agreement. A month later Quanta adopted a "poison pill" plan to prevent a takeover, prompting UtiliCorp to sue. A proxy fight ensued in the spring of 2002. Quanta maintained that UtiliCorp, which was enduring difficult times, wanted to gain controlling interest in order to consolidate Quanta's earnings with its own balance sheet. The fight came to an end in May 2002, as Quanta fended off the takeover bid.

Sale of telecommunication and fiber-optic licensing divisions
On November 20, 2012, Quanta Services sold its telecommunications subsidiaries for $275 million in cash to Dycom.
On August 4, 2015, Quanta Services sold its fiber optic licensing operations (Sunesys) to Crown Castle International Corp. (NYSE: CCI) for approximately $1 billion in cash.

Large acquisitions
On August 30, 2007, Quanta Services acquired InfraSource Services through an all-stock deal. Before the merger, Engineering News-Record ranked Quanta Services as the second-largest specialty contractor in the United States and InfraSource Services as No. 8. This acquisition received popular attention after being given positive coverage on Jim Cramer's Mad Money show, in Smart Money, and in TheStreet.

In September 2009, Quanta Services announced that a deal had been struck to acquire Price Gregory, the largest U.S. gas pipeline construction company, for $350 million. With this acquisition, Quanta Services is expected to have consolidated 2009 revenue of $4.4 billion.

On October 22, 2010, Quanta Services announced agreement to acquire Canada's largest electric power line contractors Valard Construction for approximately $219 million.

On September 2, 2021, Quanta Services announced that it has entered into a definitive agreement to acquire Blattner Holding Company (Blattner), one of the largest and leading utility-scale renewable energy infrastructure solutions provider in North America for $2.7 billion in stock and cash.  Blattner generated full-year 2020 revenues and adjusted EBITDA (a non-GAAP measure) of approximately $2.4 billion and $291 million, respectively.

Awards
 No. 283 2019 Fortune 500 List
 No. 1 2016 Engineering News Record Specialty Contractor
 No. 1 2016 Largest Transmission and Distribution Contractor in North America
 No. 1 2016 Largest Pipeline Contractor in North America
 No. 4 2015 Forbes Most Trustworthy Large Cap Companies
 No. 7 2016 Fleet Owners Top Truck Fleets in the U.S.
 No. 32 2015 Solar Power World Contractor Ranking

Lower Rio Grande Valley Energized Reconductor Project
On June 13, 2016, American Electric Power (AEP) received the 89th annual Edison Electric Institute's (EEI's) 2016 Edison Award, the electric power industry's most prestigious honor, for its Energized Reconductor Project in the Lower Rio Grande Valley (LRGV) of Texas. The 240 mile project was possible because of Quanta Energized Services (QES) live-line planning capabilities and North Houston Pole Line's construction expertise.

Operating units
Quanta Services has a large number of Operating Units that can broadly be classified into electric and gas services. Each typically operates independently. A list of current Quanta Services operating companies is provided below.

Quanta's North America Electric Power Operating Units
 Arizona Trench Company 
 Allteck Line Contractors
 Brent Woodward, Inc.
 Brink Constructors
 Can-Fer 
 Computapole
 Consolidated Power Project
 Crux Subsurface, Inc.
 Dacon 
 Dashiell Corporation
 DNR Pressure Welding Ltd.
 EHV Power
 Groves Electrical Services
 Hargrave Power
 Intermountain Electric
 InfraSource 
 Irby Construction
 JCR Construction Company
 Longfellow Drilling Services
 LUMA Energy
 M.J. Electric
 Mears Group
 North Houston Pole Line
 Northern Powerline Constructors, Inc.
 Northstar
 Northwest Lineman College
 NOVA
 PAR Electrical Contractors
 Phasor Engineering, Inc. 
 Phoenix Power Group
 Potelco
 Probst Electric
 Quanta Energized Services
 Quanta Technology
 Quanta Telecommunication Services
 Quanta Utility Engineering Services
 Realtime Utility Engineers
 Ryan Company
 Service Electric Company
 Summit Line Construction
 Sumter Utilities
 TC Infrastructure Services
 The Aspen Utility Company
 The ComTran Group 
 Underground Construction Company
 Utilimap Corporation
 Valard Construction
 Winco Powerline Services

 Quanta's North America Natural Gas Operating Units
 1 Diamond
 Arnett & Burgess Pipelines Ltd.
 Banister
 Canadian Utility Construction
 Can-Fer 
 Hallen Construction Company 
 H.L. Chapman
 InfraSource
 Jet Tank Services
 Mears Group
 M.G. Dyess
 Microline
 North Houston Pole Line
 NorthStar Energy Services (Formerly Bradford Brothers, Inc. and Flint Construction Company)
 O.J. Pipelines
 PAR Electrical Contractors
 Performance Energy Services
 Price Gregory
 Quanta Marine Services LLC
 Q-Inline
 QPS Engineering
 RMS Welding Systems
 SpreadBoss
 T.G. Mercer
 Underground Construction Company

 Quanta's International Operating Units
 Quanta Power Solutions, Inda
 Quanta Services, Africa
 Quanta Services, Australia
 COE Drilling (AU)
 Consolidated Power Projects (AU)
 Enscope (AU)
 Mears Integrity (AU)
 Nacap (AU)
 NJ Construction (AU)
 Quanta Services, Latin America
 Quanta Services Philippines, Philippines

References

External links

Companies listed on the New York Stock Exchange
Companies based in Houston
Construction and civil engineering companies of the United States
Engineering companies of the United States
Energy engineering and contractor companies
American companies established in 1997
1998 initial public offerings